Anadenanthera peregrina var. falcata is a timber tree native to Paraguay and Cerrado vegetation in Brazil, specially in Mato Grosso, Mato Grosso do Sul,   Minas Gerais, and  São Paulo. This plant is also used as an ornamental.

See also
 List of plants of Cerrado vegetation of Brazil

References

Notes

General references
 Sangalli, A.; Vieira, M.C.; Heredia, N.A.Z. Levantamento e caracterização de plantas nativas com propriedades medicinais em fragmentos florestais e de Cerrado de Dourados - MS, numa visão etnobotânica. ISHS Acta Horticulturae 569: I Latin-American Symposium on the Production of Medicinal, Aromatic and Condiments Plants

External links

International Legume Database & Information Service: Anadenanthera peregrina var. falcata
 Anadenanthera falcata

peregrina var. falcata
Trees of Brazil
Trees of Paraguay
Ornamental trees